List of films based on mythology may refer to:

List of films based on Greco-Roman mythology
List of films based on Germanic mythology
List of films based on Slavic mythology
List of works based on Arthurian legends#Film
List of films and television series featuring Robin Hood